Christopher William Dierker (Vietnamese: Đặng Quý Kiệt; born August 11, 1994) is a retired Vietnamese American professional basketball player for the Danang Dragons of the Vietnam Basketball Association (VBA).

Career
Dierker's mother Lien Dierker grew up in Danang, Vietnam. He attended Salem High School and joined NAIA school Madonna University. He was Madonna's career leader in rebounds (908) and was first in rebound average (7.4 per game), while finishing with 1,483 career points, seventh all time at the university. In 2016, he set the school single-game rebounding record with 19 rebounds while scoring a career-high 29 points. Dierker graduated with a degree in biology.

Danang Dragons (2018)
Dierker was selected by the Danang Dragons with the first overall pick in the 2018 VBA draft.

On November 4, 2020, in an Instagram post, Dierker officially retired from the Vietnam Basketball Association and professional basketball.

Career statistics

VBA

|-
| style="text-align:left;"| 2018
| style="text-align:left;"| Danang Dragons
| 15 || 14 || 38.5 || .490 || .260 || .470 || 11.1 || 3.2 || 1.6 || 1 || 20.5
|- class"sortbottom"
| style="text-align:center;" colspan="2"| Career
| 15 || 14 || 38.5 || .490 || .260 || .470 || 11.1 || 3.2 || 1.6 || 1 || 20.5

Awards and honors

VBA
Heritage MVP: 2018

References

1994 births
Living people
American men's basketball players
Competitors at the 2019 Southeast Asian Games
Forwards (basketball)
Madonna Crusaders men's basketball players
People from Canton, Michigan
Power forwards (basketball)
Small forwards
Southeast Asian Games bronze medalists for Vietnam
Southeast Asian Games medalists in basketball
Vietnamese basketball players
Vietnamese people of American descent
Southeast Asian Games medalists in 3x3 basketball
Competitors at the 2021 Southeast Asian Games
Southeast Asian Games silver medalists for Vietnam